Monique van der Velden (born 1973) is a Dutch former competitive figure skater. She is a three-time Dutch national champion (1993–95) and reached the free skate at the 1995 European Championships in Dortmund, Germany.

Van der Velden is from Badhoevedorp. She began skating at age nine. She was coached by Corrie Broweleit.

In 2006, she was paired with a Belgian TV presenter, Staf Coppens, on Dancing on Ice (Netherlands and Belgium). The two were named as the champions. She married Coppens on 20 September 2014. They have two children, Beau (born in February 2008) and Nora (born in December 2009).

Competitive highlights

References 

1973 births
Living people
Dutch female single skaters
People from Haarlemmermeer
Sportspeople from North Holland
20th-century Dutch women
21st-century Dutch women